Lord House is a historic home located at Lords Valley, Blooming Grove Township, Pike County, Pennsylvania.  It was built in 1850, and is a -story, brick dwelling on a random fieldstone foundation in a vernacular Georgian style.  It has a -story rear wing, gable roof, and two-story front porch.  The Lords Valley Post Office was housed in the dwelling from 1853 to 1955.

It was added to the National Register of Historic Places in 1980.

References

Houses on the National Register of Historic Places in Pennsylvania
Georgian architecture in Pennsylvania
Houses completed in 1850
Houses in Pike County, Pennsylvania
National Register of Historic Places in Pike County, Pennsylvania